William Lunn (1 November 1872 – 17 May 1942) was a Labour Party politician in the United Kingdom.

Professional life 
Born in Rothwell, Lunn began working as a coal miner when he was twelve years old.  He was later elected as checkweighman at Middleton Colliery, serving for twenty years.

Lunn was a supporter of the Labour Party, and served on Rothwell Urban District Council and the Hunslet Board of Guardians.  He stood unsuccessfully in the 1912 Holmfirth by-election.  He was elected at the 1918 general election as  Member of Parliament (MP) for the newly created Rothwell constituency, and held the seat until he died in office in 1942, aged 69.

In 1924, Lunn served  in Ramsay MacDonald's short-lived First Labour Government as Secretary for Overseas Trade, a junior ministerial post subordinate to the President of the Board of Trade.

When the Second Labour Government took office in June 1929, Lunn was appointed as Under-Secretary of State for the Colonies.  He was moved in December that year to the post of Under-Secretary of State for Dominion Affairs, and held that position until the formation of the National Government in August 1931.

From 1931 until 1936, Lunn served on the National Executive Committee of the Labour Party.

Private life 
In July 1936, during a debate on the Government's Midwives Bill, Lunn referred to the death of his daughter-in-law, earlier that day, when arguing for more to be done to protect the health of mothers.

Election literature

References

External links 
 
 William Lunn Rothwell

1872 births
1942 deaths
Labour Party (UK) MPs for English constituencies
Miners' Federation of Great Britain-sponsored MPs
UK MPs 1918–1922
UK MPs 1922–1923
UK MPs 1923–1924
UK MPs 1924–1929
UK MPs 1929–1931
UK MPs 1931–1935
UK MPs 1935–1945